Sarcoglanis simplex is a species of catfish (order Siluriformes) of the family Trichomycteridae, and the only species of the genus Sarcoglanis. This fish originates from the upper Rio Negro basin of Brazil. Stauroglanis is the sister group to a monophyletic group formed by Malacoglanis and Sarcoglanis.

References

Trichomycteridae
Taxa named by George S. Myers
Taxa named by Stanley Howard Weitzman
Fish of South America
Fish of Brazil
Fish described in 1966